Arnold Muchlis Haay (born on August 28, 1990) is an Indonesia footballer who currently plays as a defender for Persewar Waropen in the Liga 2.

References

External links

1990 births
Association football defenders
Association football midfielders
Living people
Indonesian footballers
Papuan sportspeople
Liga 1 (Indonesia) players
Persidafon Dafonsoro players